Javorje, derived from the word javor, meaning "maple", may refer to:

Croatia
Javorje (Brdovec), village near Brdovec
Javorje (Novi Vinodolski), village near  Novi Vinodolski

Serbia
Javorje (Vlasotince), village
Javorje (Serbia), mountain in western Serbia

Slovenia
Javorje, Velike Lašče, a settlement in the Municipality of Velike Lašče 
Javorje, Črna na Koroškem, a settlement in the Municipality of Črna na Koroškem
Javorje, Hrpelje-Kozina, a settlement in the Municipality of Hrpelje-Kozina
Javorje pri Gabrovki, a settlement in the Municipality of Litija
Javorje pri Blagovici, a settlement in the Municipality of Lukovica
Javorje, Gorenja Vas–Poljane, a settlement in the Municipality of Gorenja Vas–Poljane
Javorje (Slovenia), a mountain in the Kamnik–Savinja Alps

See also
Javor (disambiguation)